Aleksandr Nikolayevich Bolonin (born 4 March 1991) is a Russian professional football player who plays for FC Volgar Astrakhan.

Club career
He made his Russian Football National League debut for FC Volgar Astrakhan on 11 July 2015 in a game against FC Sibir Novosibirsk.

External links
 

1991 births
Sportspeople from Astrakhan
Living people
Russian footballers
Association football midfielders
FC Fakel Voronezh players
FC Volgar Astrakhan players
Russian First League players
Russian Second League players